Lívia Járóka (born 6 October 1974, in Tata) is a Hungarian politician. She is a Member of the European Parliament, first elected as part of the Fidesz list in 2004. Járóka is the second Romani (and the first Romani woman) ever elected to the European Parliament (after Juan de Dios Ramírez Heredia from Spain, who served from 1986 to 1999).

Járóka grew up in Sopron, a town near Hungary's western border with Austria. Her father is ethnically Roma, her mother Hungarian. After getting an MA in sociology from the Warsaw campus of the Central European University on a scholarship from the Open Society Institute she went on to study anthropology in Britain, focusing on Romani issues and culture. In August 2003 she had a daughter and a son in 2007. In 2012 she finished her PhD in Social Anthropology at the University College London.

Járóka has been criticized as an apologist for the treatment of Hungarian Roma by her party, Fidesz. She has also declined to criticize Fidesz' campaign against George Soros, and the party's attacks on her alma mater, the Central European University.

Memberships 
She is a member of the Committee on Women's Rights and Gender Equality and the Delegation for Realtions with South Africa. She is a substitute member of the Committee on Employment and Social Affairs, as well the Delegation for Relations with the Korean Peninsula.

In 2014 she retired as an MEP but returned on 15 September 2017 after Ildikó Gáll-Pelcz left the European Parliament. She was elected a Vice-President of the European Parliament on 15 November 2017. She was re-elected in that position on 3 July 2019. She served as Vice-President until 17 January 2022.

Personal life
She is married and has two children.

Other memberships 

Roma Education Fund 
 High Level Group of Roma Diplomacy Program
European Roma Information Office
 Prior Board Member of Open Society Institute, Roma Memorial University Scholarship Program

Research activities 
 September 2000-April 2002: Ethnographic field research on assimilation tendencies of Roma in Hungary
 May 1998-May 2001: Sociological research among Roma students of Gandhi Gimnazium, Hungary
 2000 - 2003 University College of London, PhD research on ethnic relations and economics, identity and radicalisation in cultural self-representation of the young Roma in the 8. District, an urban slum in Budapest

Awards 
 Elected Young Global Leader in 2006 by the Forum of Young Global Leaders and the World Economic Forum
 2006 and 2013 Member of the European Parliament of the Year (MEP) award in the category of Justice and Fundamental Rights
 Awarded the Romanian Foreign Ministry's Excellency Award for the Social Integration of Minorities in 2010
 Awarded the Presidential Order of Merit of Hungary for her outstanding work during the Hungarian Presidency of the Council of the EU in 2011
 Won the St. Adalbert Award of the Hungarian Association of Christian Intellectuals in 2011
 Award of the "Fundación Secretariado Gitano" in 2012

References

External links
 Official Website
 Speech by Lívia Járóka at Second European Roma Summit
 University College London student profile

Hungarian Romani people
Hungarian women anthropologists
Romani politicians
Living people
1974 births
Fidesz politicians
Fidesz MEPs
MEPs for Hungary 2004–2009
MEPs for Hungary 2009–2014
Women MEPs for Hungary
Central European University alumni
People from Tata, Hungary
MEPs for Hungary 2014–2019
MEPs for Hungary 2019–2024
21st-century Hungarian politicians
21st-century Hungarian women politicians